Federica Urgesi (born 29 January 2005) is an Italian tennis player.

She has a career high WTA singles ranking of 818 achieved on 7 November 2022. She also has a career high WTA doubles ranking of 674 achieved on 14 November 2022.

Urgesi and her partner Renáta Jamrichová won the 2023 Australian girls' doubles title beating Hayu Kinoshita and Sara Saito in the final.

Junior Grand Slam finals

Girls' doubles

References

External links
 
 

2005 births
Living people
Italian female tennis players
Grand Slam (tennis) champions in girls' doubles
Australian Open (tennis) junior champions